Rhyon Nicole Brown (born October 6, 1992) is an American actress, singer, and dancer.

Career
She made her film debut in Santa & Pete (1999) And has since appeared in various television shows. Brown has had recurring roles on shows such as That's So Raven as Madison, on Judging Amy as Rebecca Van Exel, and most recently a starring role on the ABC Family TV series Lincoln Heights as Lizzie Sutton. In 2005, she appeared in 50 Cent's semi-biographical film, Get Rich or Die Tryin' as the younger version of 50 Cent's love interest Charlene. Brown also stars as R&B singer Michel'le in the 2016 Lifetime movie Surviving Compton: Dre, Suge & Michel'le.

Brown is best known for her role as Elizabeth "Lizzie" Sutton on the ABC Family series, Lincoln Heights ran from 2007 to 2009.

Personal life
Brown is a graduate of Junipero Serra High School in San Juan Capistrano, California. In her spare time, she enjoys traveling, dancing, singing, reading, cheerleading, sports and hanging out with her family.
She recently graduated from the University of Southern California. Rhyon is the younger sister of R&B singer RaVaughn.

Filmography

Film

Television

References

External links

1992 births
Actresses from Los Angeles
American child actresses
American television actresses
Living people
University of Southern California alumni
African-American actresses
21st-century African-American people
21st-century African-American women